Megalneusaurus is an extinct genus of large pliosaur that lived in the Sundance Sea during the Kimmeridgian, ~156-152 million years ago, in the Late Jurassic. It was named by paleontologist W. C. Knight in 1895.

The genus and type species was based upon ribs, vertebrae, a fore-paddle and fragments of the pectoral girdle discovered in the Sundance Formation in Wyoming, USA in 1895. The species named as Megalneusaurus rex (meaning "great swimming lizard king") in 1898.
However some of this material has since been lost, although new material has been discovered from the same site.
Based upon the bones very large size, it appears to have grown to a size comparable to Liopleurodon.

Material from southern Alaska have been referred to Megalneusaurus, although this material is from an individual of much smaller size, twice lesser than M. rex.

Description
 

Habitat
Megalneusaurus hunted in the warm waters of the Sundance Sea around 150 million years ago. The large, inland sea hosted a wide array of marine reptiles, including the ichthyosaur Baptanodon, and the cryptoclidid plesiosaurs Pantosaurus and Tatenectes.

See also

 List of plesiosaur genera
 Timeline of plesiosaur research

References

Late Jurassic plesiosaurs
Late Jurassic reptiles of North America
Jurassic plesiosaurs of North America
Sauropterygian genera